This is a list of characters from Tramps Like Us (Kimi wa Petto).

Main characters
 Drama role by:Koyuki
Sumire Iwaya is a hard-working and highly successful journalist, who is demoted to the lifestyle section after punching her boss when he sexually harasses her.  Ogawa feels that Sumire's "stubborn" personality at the beginning stems from Ogawa's own experience as a new manga artist.
Sumire enjoys both her job and her romance with Hasumi, unlike depictions of female characters in the 1980s and 1990s. At the end of the manga, she notices that she has fallen in love with Momo and in the last chapter, she marries him.
, or  Drama role by:Jun Matsumoto. Film role by:Jang Keun-suk
A young dancer who Sumire finds and takes in as her pet.  Initially, Ogawa had intended to make him much more animal-like in his mannerisms.  He is said to represent a "comfortable, cooperative, and compatible" sort of a man.
 Drama role by:Seiichi Tanabe
Hasumi is a successful journalist who went to university with Sumire.  He is said to represent the "three highs" (tall, high income, well-educated) kind of a man that Japanese women have stereotypically desired.

Other characters
  Drama role by:Sarina Suzuki
 Sumire's childhood friend, a housewife to a pilot and mother of Ran.
  Drama role by: Satomi Ishihara
 Momo's ex-girlfriend, a dancer
  Drama role by:Wakana Sakai
 A dental assistant (manga)/office worker (drama) determined to seduce and marry Hasumi-senpai.
 Emma Owen and Hugh Oswald
 Two American journalists who work under Sumire.

 Satoshi Asano
A company therapist in the TV series. He owns a long-haired chihuahua and talks with Sumire about pets a lot.  He changes the dog's name every day. Drama role by: Kyozo Nagatsuka
 Junpei Horibei
Takeshi (Momo)'s friend who also does ballet.  In the TV series he has an unrequited love for Rumi. Drama role by: Eita
 Mayumi Haruki
One of Sumire's co-workers. Drama role by: Misa Uehara
 Yuuta Ishida
One of Sumire's co-workers. Drama role by: Sato Riyuuta
 Ooishi Minori
Sumire's landlord in the TV drama, he is a very cheery person.
 Mrs Kusunoki
One of Sumire's neighbours in the TV drama.  Very noisy.
 Edmond Sukenari
One of Sumire's co-workers.  He is an otaku who collects figurines.  His mother was American, but she died when he was young.  He wears glasses, and everyone is transfixed by how attractive he is when he takes them off.  He doesn't realise this.  He admires Sumire.  (Vol. 10-)
 Shinobu
Sumire's older sister.  She is very conventional and supportive of her grandfather.  She practices a tough love on her younger sisters.  She is married with children.
 Akane
Sumire's younger sister.  She is rebellious, smokes, and founded a biker gang.

References

Tramps Like Us